Clowns of America International Inc., (COAI) is a Minnesota-based nonprofit clown arts membership organization which aims 'to share, educate and act as a gathering place for serious minded amateurs, semi-professionals, and professional clowns.' It provides its members with resources needed for its members to refine and develop their characters. The COAI follows a strict code of ethics, known as the "Eight Clown Commandments". In addition to the co-operative nature of the group and its annual conventions, it also provides several scholarship opportunities to young men and women.

History 
Formerly Clowns of America, COAI was founded in its current form in 1984. In the early 1980s, Clowns of America had financial problems. This led to its breakup and the founding of COAI and the World Clown Association. 

It comprises numerous alleys, local clown clubs which act as meeting places for members. According to the COAI bylaws, any group with at least five members that form a local chapter are considered to be a clown alley. 

The COAI also publishes its own bimonthly magazine, The New Calliope, containing information about the organization, news, events, and clown-related articles.

Affiliates
 Mid Atlantic Clown Association
 Mid West Clown Association
 Southeast Clown Association
 Texas Clown Association
 Pennsylvania East Clown Company Association

See also
 Charlie Award
 Clown society
 The New Calliope

References

External links
 Clowns of America International official homepage
 https://www.coaiconvention.com/ Convention in April 2022

Clowning
Clubs and societies in the United States
Philanthropic organizations based in the United States